Kahleberg (Bald Mountain) is a mountain of Saxony, southeastern Germany.

History
Kahleberg is located 2 kilometres south-west of the mining town Altenberg, which is on the border of the Czech Republic.

Mountains of Saxony
Mountains of the Ore Mountains